Tuukka is a Finnish male given name. The origin of the name may be from the Scandinavian names Tore and Tor, but other studies suggest the origin comes from the names Thoke and Thuki.

People named Tuukka include:
Tuukka Kotti (born 1981), Finnish basketball player
Tuukka Mäkelä (1927–2005), Finnish sports shooter
Tuukka Mäkelä (born 1982), Finnish ice hockey player
Tuukka Mäntylä (born 1981), Finnish ice hockey player
Tuukka Pulliainen (born 1984), Finnish ice hockey player
Tuukka Rask (born 1987), Finnish ice hockey goaltender
Tuukka Smura (born 1995), Finnish ice hockey goaltender
Tuukka Tiensuu (born 1953), Finnish TV-director, writer and producer

References

Finnish masculine given names